Studio Universal Latin America is a 24-hour cable television channel broadcasting from New York, United States, targeted for Middle and South American audiences.

It is owned by Universal Networks International, a division of NBCUniversal, and was launched in Latin America in September, 1997. It mostly airs American movies and films and some series and is a sister channel to Universal Channel in the region. It broadcasts in four feeds, Brasil, Mexico, Argentina and Latam. From its launch until January 31, 2010 the channel was named Hallmark Channel. It was renamed Studio Universal on February 1, 2010.

The Brazilian feed of the channel, as well as its sister network, Syfy, are operated since mid-July 2012, by the joint venture between Universal Networks International and Organizações Globo-owned Globosat which already operated the Brazilian version of Universal Channel.

Feeds
Mexican feed. Aired in Mexico.
Argentine feed. Aired in Argentina, Paraguay and Uruguay.
Chilean feed. Aired in Chile.
Brazilian feed. Aired in Brazil, operated by a joint venture between NBCU and Globosat and distributed by the latter.
Latam feed. Aired in the rest of Latin America.
Colombian feed. Aired in Colombia.

Programming

Current
Fullscreen

Previous
Fairly Legal
Nurse Jackie
Psych (seasons 5-8)
Ringer
Smash (only season 2)
The Good Wife (seasons 4-5, seasons 1-3 and 6 air on Universal Channel)
Monk (repeats)

See also
Hallmark Channel (International)
Hallmark Channel

References

External links
Latin America
Brazil

Television networks in the United States
Television channels and stations established in 1997